Darkness Divided was an American Christian metalcore band from San Antonio, Texas, United States, formed in 2010 by brothers Gerard, Christopher, and Joseph Mora. The band had released two studio albums through Victory Records as well as an independent EP.

History

Early Years and Formation (2010–2012)
As teenagers, the Mora brothers performed worship music together at their local church, mostly performing covers of contemporary worship songs. In 2010, the brothers changed genres and started Darkness Divided with original drummer Colby Moreno and second guitar/backup vocalist Joey Jiménez after becoming fans of metal music. The new band was named Darkness Divided after the Biblical verse Genesis 1:4, and is described by the band as a reference to finding hope in tough times.

Chronicles and Written in Blood (2012–2015)
In 2012, Darkness Divided released a 5 track EP entitled Chronicles, which was produced by Daniel Castleman.

Since releasing Chronicles, the band released two singles with accompanying music videos. Redeemer was produced with Daniel Castleman, while "Voyager" was produced elsewhere.

Prior to its release, Teen View Music stated that Written in Blood was  Intelligently put together and expertly recorded, Written in Blood has the fuel and fire for a metalcore fan. It is obvious to me just by listening to the album that their live shows are electric with energy and absolute loads of fun. For fans of Christian metal, this is a must-have.
Jesus Freak Hideout says "Heavy metal newcomers, Darkness Divided, will release their Victory Records debut album, Written In Blood, on August 19th. Written In Blood is an 11-track assault of deeply penetrating, sometimes chaotic, sometimes melodic, but always brutalizing metal core riffage coupled with crushing rhythmic breakdowns and Gerard Mora's thunderously demanding vocals. Driven by faith and fueled by conviction, Darkness Divided are on a mission to prove that through suffering comes salvation." They released a new single called "A Well Run Dry" off their upcoming album to iTunes and released an animated stream of the song to YouTube on July 15. They released their second single "The Hands That Bled" along with a music video on August 11.

Departure of Chris Mora, Induction of Hayden Allen, self titled album,  The End of It All EP and break up (2015–2018) 
On November 11, 2015, guitarist Chris Mora put out an announcement on the band's Facebook page. 

In 2016, the band released their sophomore self titled on Victory Records. In 2017, the band embarked on many tours. The band would go on tour with Convictions in October 2017, replacing Earth Groans, who took the first half of the date.

In late 2017, the band announced they would disband in 2018 after releasing one final EP and doing one final tour from March to May, with the final show taking place at the Alamo City Music Hall in San Antonio, Texas on May 12. The band released their final EP, The End of It All, digitally on March 9.

Music and lyrics 
Gerard Mora gave an interview in Outburn, where he was asked "What lyrical themes do you explore?", while his response was the following:  He was also asked during the same interview, "Could you ever see yourselves touring with a secular band?", and his answer was the following:

Members

 Final lineup
 Gerard Mora – lead vocals (2010–2018)
 Joseph Mora – bass guitar (2010–2018) 
 Sebastian Elizondo – vocals (2014–2018), lead guitar (2015–2018), rhythm guitar (2014–2015)
 Hayden Allen – drums (2015–2018)

 Former members
 Christopher James Mora – lead guitar (2010–2015)
 Israel Hernandez – drums (2010–2014)
 Isaiah Alfonso – drums (2014–2015)

Session members
 Juan Hinojosa – drums (2018)

Timeline

Discography

Studio albums

EPs
 Chronicles (2012)
 The End of It All (2018)

Singles

Music videos

References

External links
Official Victory Records profile page
Official facebook profile
 Retrieved on September 12, 2016.

American avant-garde metal musical groups
Metalcore musical groups from Texas
Victory Records artists
Heavy metal musical groups from Texas
Musical groups established in 2010
Musical groups from San Antonio
Musical quintets
Musical groups disestablished in 2018
2010 establishments in Texas